Mohammed Abdu Arena, officially as the Artist of the Arabs Mohammed Abdu Stage, is a 22,000 seat multipurpose arena in the "Theaters" area of The Boulevard recreational complex in Hittin, Riyadh, Saudi Arabia.

Named after the Saudi singer Mohammed Abdu Othman, it was established following the inauguration of Boulevard Riyadh City in October 2019 during the beginning week of the first edition of Riyadh Season entertainment festival. Since its inception, the arena has hosted events like The Filipino Night, WWE's Super Showdown and Crown Jewel.

History 
On 12 October 2019, a day after the launch of the 2019 edition of Riyadh Season, the president of General Entertainment Authority Turki al-Sheikh announced the establishment of Mohammed Abdu Arena and Abu Bakr al-Salem Stage through is official Twitter handle.

References 

Arenas
Riyadh
2019 establishments in Saudi Arabia
Entertainment venues in Saudi Arabia
Tourist attractions in Saudi Arabia